The Hillside Football Club, nicknamed the Sharks, is an Australian rules football club located in Hillside, Victoria, north west of Melbourne. The club originated in 1999 as the Sydenham–Hillside Football Club with the intention to field junior sides, and in 2005 established a senior side in the Essendon District Football League (EDFL).

Between 2005 and 2013, the Senior Men's team competed in Division 2, but was promoted to Division 1 after winning the Division 2 premiership, defeating Moonee Valley 22.13 (145) to 13.4 (82). Today, the club fields teams in Division 1 and Division 1 Reserves, in the Premier Division of the EDFL Women's competition, and a number of junior squads.

Honours

References

External links
 

Essendon District Football League clubs
1999 establishments in Australia
Australian rules football clubs established in 1999
Australian rules football clubs in Melbourne
Sport in the City of Melton